Continues is the debut studio album of Continues, released on May 1, 2012 by Mattress Recordings. Composer Dan Gatto wanted to take his music in a synthpop direction similar to what he had been influenced by as a teenager.

Reception
Brutal Resonance awarded Continues a nine out of ten, calling it "all beautifully performed and put together" and "a deft approach in Synthpop with a Minimal undertone to it."

Track listing

Personnel
Adapted from the Continues liner notes.

Mentallo & The Fixer
 Dan Gatto – vocals, instruments

Production and design
 Jean Béraud – cover art, illustrations
 Larry Goetz – recording, mixing

Release history

References

External links 
 
 Continues at Bandcamp

2008 debut albums